The 2007 Skyrunning European Championships was the 1st edition of the global skyrunning competition, Skyrunning European Championships, organised by the International Skyrunning Federation and was held in Poschiavo (Switzerland), took place on 10 June 2007, coinciding with the International SkyRace Valmalenco-Valposchiavo, from Valmalenco, Sondrio (Italy) to Valposchiavo, Switzerland.

Results
The race of the International SkyRace Valmalenco-Valposchiavo (31 km, +1850m/-1800m) was the only competition with 488 athletes who reached the finish line of both sexes and nations (including non-European ones). obviously the medals of the European Championships were awarded by compiling single rankings, male and female, and not including non-European athletes.

Men's SkyRace

Women's SkyRace

References

External links
 International Skyrunning Federation official web site

Skyrunning European Championships